{{DISPLAYTITLE:C26H34O7}}
The molecular formula C26H34O7 (molar mass: 458.54 g/mol, exact mass: 458.2305 u) may refer to:

 Berkeleytrione
 Fumagillin

Molecular formulas